The United States Nordic Combined Championships 2012 took place on October 1, 2011 in Fox River Grove, Illinois. The olympic medalist Bill Demong won the race.

Results 
<div style="float:left; text-align:left; padding-right:15px;">

References 
 Results on the U.S. Ski Team's website
 Results on the Norge ski club's website

2012 in Nordic combined
2012 in American sports
United States Nordic Combined Championships
2012 in sports in Illinois